Qarah Bolagh Rural District is in Bagh Helli District of Soltaniyeh County, Zanjan province, Iran. Prior to the 2016 National Census, the constituent villages of Qarah Bolagh were in Soltaniyeh District of Abhar County. The district was separated from the county to establish Soltaniyeh County.

At the most recent census of 2016, the population of the rural district was 4,794 in 1,552 households, by which time it was in Bagh Helli District of the newly formed county. The largest of its 19 villages was Kheyrabad, with 2,764 people.

References 

Soltaniyeh County

Rural Districts of Zanjan Province

Populated places in Zanjan Province

Populated places in Soltaniyeh County

fa:دهستان قره‌بلاغ (سلطانیه)